The Chukou Nature Center is a nature center in Xinfu Village, Fanlu Township, Chiayi County, Taiwan.

History
The site of the center was originally the sugar farm of Taiwan Sugar Corporation. It was then later turned into Chukou Nature Center. In 2004, the Chiayi Forest District Office established the Tree Bank and Forest Ecological Park at the center.

Ecology
The center is the center providing trees from various rare species. It also features drift-wood storage, eco-waterways and greenhouses.

See also
 List of tourist attractions in Taiwan

References

External links

 

Landforms of Chiayi County
Nature centers
Tourist attractions in Chiayi County